KF Dushkaja is a professional football club from Kosovo which competes in the Second League. The club is based in Gjakovë. Their home ground is the Dushkaja Sports Field which has a viewing capacity of 500. They are named after the Dushkaja region.

See also
 List of football clubs in Kosovo

References

Football clubs in Kosovo
Association football clubs established in 2000